Nyköping Municipality in Sweden held a municipal election on 17 September 2006.

Results
The number of seats remained at 61 with the Social Democrats winning the most at 26, a drop of three from 2002. The number of valid ballots cast were 31,589.

By constituency

Urban and rural votes

Percentage points

By votes

Electoral wards
There were three constituencies: Eastern, Northern and Western. Helgona, Herrhagen, Högbrunn and Väster hade some sparsely populated rural areas part of the districts, but were all majority urban.

Nyköping

Rural areas

References

Nyköping municipal elections
Nyköping